Golshavar (also Romanized as Golshavār, Golashvār, and Goleshvār; also known as Gūshvār) is a village in Howmeh Rural District, in the Central District of Minab County, Hormozgan Province, Iran. At the 2006 census, its population was 458, in 87 families.

References 

Populated places in Minab County